This is a list of official government gazettes for current and former British colonies or protectorates. Some are available to consult at the British National Archives or the British Library.

See also
List of government gazettes

References

British Empire
British colonial gazettes